Daniel Charles Williams (born March 8, 1989) is a professional soccer player who last played for Pafos in the Cypriot First Division, and the United States national team.

Early life
Born in Karlsruhe, West Germany, Williams is the son of an African American father and German mother. His father is originally from North Carolina, and was stationed in Heidelberg while serving in the United States military. Williams is a citizen of both Germany and the United States.

Club career

SC Freiburg
Williams began his career in 1998 with the Karlsruher SC youth setup and  played from July 2004 for the SC Freiburg youth and reserve sides.

He made his Bundesliga debut for the Freibrug first team on January 22, 2010 against Stuttgart. He would go on to make nine appearances for Freiburg in 2010, two of them being starts.

1899 Hoffenheim
Williams joined the Bundesliga club Hoffenheim on August 31, 2011. During his first appearance for the club on September 10, 2011, he made an assist in a 4–0 Hoffenheim victory over Mainz.

Reading
On June 25, 2013, it was confirmed that Williams joined Reading in the English Championship on a four-year contract. On August 3, Williams made his debut in the season opener against Ipswich Town. He came on as a sub in the second half as Reading won the game 2–1. He scored his first goal for the club on February 1, 2014, in a 3–0 win against Millwall.

Huddersfield Town
On July 4, 2017, Williams signed a two-year contract with newly promoted Premier League side Huddersfield Town after rejecting a new contract with Reading. He made his league debut against Crystal Palace in a 3–0 win. He scored his first goal for Huddersfield in an FA Cup tie against Bolton Wanderers on 6 January 2018. On May 17, 2019, Huddersfield announced that they were releasing Williams at the end of the season.

Pafos
On September 6, 2019, Williams signed for Pafos of the Cypriot First Division. On May 18, 2020, Pafos announced that Williams had left the club by mutual termination of his contract.

International career
Williams represented the Germany under-15 team. However, due to FIFA regulations concerning dual citizenship, he remained eligible to play at the senior level for either Germany or the United States.

On September 30, 2011, Williams obtained an American passport, making him eligible to play for the United States national team. He was called up by the United States team for two friendlies in October 2011, and made his first appearance for the U.S. on October 8, 2011 in a 1–0 victory against Honduras. Williams was the first player to earn his first national team cap under the Americans' new head coach Jürgen Klinsmann. On June 5, 2015 Williams scored his first international goal in Amsterdam in a friendly against the Netherlands. The goal was an equalizer for the United States who had been trailing 3–1 against the Dutch. The United States went on to win the game 4–3. On September 8, 2015, he scored a goal in a friendly against Brazil which ended in a 4–1 defeat.

Career statistics

Club

International

Scores and results list United States' goal tally first, score column indicates score after each Williams goal.

References

External links 

1989 births
Living people
Footballers from Karlsruhe
German people of African-American descent
Citizens of the United States through descent
German emigrants to the United States
German footballers
Germany youth international footballers
African-American soccer players
American soccer players
United States men's international soccer players
German expatriate footballers
American expatriate soccer players
Expatriate footballers in England
Association football midfielders
SC Freiburg players
Karlsruher SC players
TSG 1899 Hoffenheim players
TSG 1899 Hoffenheim II players
Reading F.C. players
Bundesliga players
Huddersfield Town A.F.C. players
Pafos FC players
Premier League players
English Football League players
Cypriot First Division players
21st-century African-American sportspeople
20th-century African-American people